Sachsenhausen or Sachsenhausen-Oranienburg was a German Nazi concentration camp in Oranienburg, Germany, used from 1936 until April 1945, shortly before the defeat of Nazi Germany in May later that year. It mainly held political prisoners throughout World War II. Prominent prisoners included Joseph Stalin's oldest son, Yakov Dzhugashvili; assassin Herschel Grynszpan; Paul Reynaud, the penultimate Prime Minister of France; Francisco Largo Caballero, Prime Minister of the Second Spanish Republic during the Spanish Civil War; the wife and children of the Crown Prince of Bavaria; Ukrainian nationalist leader Stepan Bandera; and several enemy soldiers and political dissidents.

Sachsenhausen was a labor camp, outfitted with several subcamps, a gas chamber, and a medical experimentation area. Prisoners were treated inhumanely, fed inadequately, and killed openly. After World War II, when Oranienburg was in the Soviet Occupation Zone, the structure was used by the NKVD as NKVD special camp Nr. 7. Today, Sachsenhausen is open to the public as a memorial.

Sachsenhausen under Nazi Germany

The camp was established in 1936. Initially, the camp was used to perfect the most efficient and effective execution method for use in the death camps. Given that, executions obviously took place at Sachsenhausen, especially of Soviet prisoners of war.

During the earlier stages of the camp's existence, the executions were done by placing the prisoners in a small room, often even with music playing, called the Genickschussbaracke and told they were to have their height and weight measured but were instead shot in the back of the neck through a sliding door located behind the neck. This was found to be far too time-consuming, so they then trialled a trench, killing either by shooting or by hanging. While this more easily enabled group executions, it created too much initial panic among the prisoners, making them harder to control. Then small scale trials of what would go on to become the large scale, death camp gas chambers were designed and carried out. These trials showed the authorities that this method facilitated the means to murder the largest number of prisoners without "excessive" initial panic. So by September 1941, when they were conducting the first trials of this method at Auschwitz, Sachsenhausen had already been the scene of "some gassings in conjunction with the development of gas vans".

The prisoners were also used as a workforce, with a large task force of prisoners from the camp sent to work in the nearby brickworks to meet Albert Speer's vision of rebuilding Berlin.

Camp layout

In July 1936, the Esterwegen concentration camp and Columbia concentration camp were closed and those prisoners moved to the Oranienburg concentration camp. By 1937, the prisoners had erected prisoners' barracks and SS guards' quarters, and SS officers' families housing. Tower A was at its central control point, linked to the SS troop camp outside along the central axis. The entire camp could be viewed by the SS command staff from Tower A. Initially  in area, the camp eventually grew to cover . Designed by Bernhard Kuiper, Himmler called Sachsenhausen a "completely new concentration camp for the modern age, which can be extended at any time." In practice, however, extending the design proved impractical.

There was an infirmary inside the southern angle of the perimeter and a camp prison within the eastern angle. There was also a camp kitchen and a camp laundry. The camp's capacity became inadequate and the camp was expanded in 1938 by a new rectangular area (the "small camp") northeast of the entrance gate and the perimeter wall was altered to enclose it. There was an additional area (Sonderlager) outside the main camp perimeter to the north; this consisted of two huts Sonderlager 'A' and 'B' built in 1941 for special prisoners that the regime wished to isolate.

Neutral zone

The neutral zone was located between the camp wall and the prisoners' camp. Between the zone and the wall was a trip wire, Cheval de frise, barbed-wire obstacles, an electrified barbed-wire fence, and a sentry path.

Slave labour

Sachsenhausen was the site of Operation Bernhard, one of the largest currency counterfeiting operations ever recorded. The Germans forced inmate artisans to produce forged American and British currency, as part of a plan to undermine the British and American economies, courtesy of Sicherheitsdienst (SD) chief Reinhard Heydrich. The Germans introduced fake British £5, £10, £20 and £50 notes into circulation in 1943: the Bank of England never found them. Plans had been made to drop British pounds over London by plane. Today, these notes are considered very valuable by collectors.

An industrial area, outside the western camp perimeter, contained SS workshops in which prisoners were forced to work; those unable to work had to stand at attention for the duration of the working day. Heinkel, the aircraft manufacturer, was a major user of Sachsenhausen labour, using between 6,000 and 8,000 prisoners on their He 177 bomber. Although official German reports claimed the prisoners were "working without fault", some of these aircraft crashed unexpectedly around Stalingrad and it is suspected that prisoners had sabotaged them. Other firms included AEG and Siemens. Prisoners also worked in a brick factory.

Prisoner abuses

Overall, at least 30,000 inmates died in Sachsenhausen from causes such as exhaustion, disease, malnutrition and pneumonia, as a result of the poor living conditions. Many were executed or died as the result of brutal medical experimentation.

In 1937, the SS constructed a Cell Block for the punishment, interrogation, and torture of prisoners. Important people confined there including Martin Niemöller and Georg Elser.

From 1939 until 1943, over 600 homosexual prisoners were killed.

In November 1940, the SS executed 33 Polish prisoners by firing squad. In April 1941, over 550 prisoners were killed under Action 14f13.  In the autumn of 1941, over 10,000 Soviet prisoners of war were shot.

In May 1942, the first hangings commenced from gallows in the roll-call area.  These continued until 1945.

In May 1942, 71 Dutch resistance fighters and 250 Jewish hostages were executed.

In May 1942, "Station Z" was completed in an industrial yard outside the camp walls. It included prisoner killing rooms, four crematoria, and a gas chamber after 1943. In 1941, an adjacent sand pit was enlarged and made into an "execution trench".

Camp punishments could be harsh. Some would be required to assume the "Sachsenhausen salute" where a prisoner would squat with his arms outstretched in front. Prisoners assigned to the camp prison would be kept in isolation on poor rations and some would be suspended from posts by their wrists tied behind their backs (strappado). In cases such as attempted escape, there would be a public hanging in front of the assembled prisoners.
Prisoners of war were made to run up to  a day with heavy packs, sometimes after being given performance-boosting drugs like cocaine, to trial military boots in tests commissioned by shoe factories.

 did experiments using the lethal sulfur mustard gas.

There have also been allegations of an experimental drug tested upon unwilling inmates in 1944 designated "D-IX" at the Sachsenhausen facility. Designed to increase stamina and endurance, this drug, supposedly consisting of a cocktail of cocaine, methamphetamine (Pervitin), and oxycodone (Eukodal), was designed to see use from members of the Wehrmacht, Kriegsmarine and Luftwaffe to enhance mission performance where longevity and exhaustion become pertinent issues. While these drugs were used in their individual forms by all branches of the German military, the nature and use there of D-IX specifically (especially experimentation upon Sachsenhausen prisoners) lacks enough substantiation to be considered credible, though experiments by the Nazis upon unwilling prisoners utilizing psychoactive compounds is far from myth, and could hardly be ruled outside the realm of plausibility.

Prisoners held or executed at Sachsenhausen

Seven men of the British Army's No. 2 Commando, captured after the highly successful Operation Musketoon, were executed at Sachsenhausen. They were shot on 23 October 1942, five days after Adolf Hitler issued his commando order calling for the killing of all captured members of commando units.

Four SOE agents led by Lt Cdr Mike Cumberlege RNR, who took part in the 1943 Operation Locksmith in Greece intended to blow up the Corinth Canal and were captured in May 1943, were held in Sachsenhausen's Zellenbau isolation cells for more than a year before being executed in February/March 1945.

Survivors of Operation Checkmate, a 1942 commando anti-shipping operation in Norway, including their leader, John Godwin, RN, were held at Sachsenhausen until February 1945, when they were executed. Godwin managed to wrestle the pistol of the firing party commander from his belt and shot him dead before being himself shot.

The Zellenbau of about 80 cells held some of World War II's most persistent Allied escapees as well as German dissidents, Nazi deserters and nationalists from East Europe such as the Ukrainian leader Taras Bulba-Borovets whom the Nazis hoped to persuade to change sides and fight the Soviets.

Over the course of its operation, over 100 Dutch resistance fighters were executed at Sachsenhausen. Dutch Freemasons were also sent to the camp including the Grand Master of the Grand Orient of the Netherlands, who died there in March 1941, after being arrested by Klaus Barbie.

Aftermath

At the end of 1944, Himmler ordered the execution of every prisoner. Sick inmates were executed in the industrial yard, including at least 2,000, or transferred to death camps. In February 1945, more than 1,300 prisoners were executed during the evacuation of the Lieberose forced labor camp, a subsidiary of Sachsenhausen. With the advance of the Red Army in the spring of 1945, Sachsenhausen was prepared for evacuation. On 21 April, the camp's SS staff ordered 33,000 inmates on a forced march northwest. Most of the prisoners were physically exhausted and thousands did not survive this death march; those who collapsed en route were shot by the SS. The march ended near Raben Steinfeld in early May, after liberation by the Red Army and US Army. On 22 April 1945, the camp's remaining 3,400 inmates were liberated by the 1st Belorussian Front and the Polish 2nd Infantry Division.

According to an article published on 13 December 2001 in The New York Times: "In the early years of the war the SS practiced methods of mass killing there that were later used in the Nazi death camps. Of the roughly 30,000 wartime victims at Sachsenhausen, most were Russian prisoners of war".

NKVD special camp Nr. 7 / Soviet Special Camp Nr. 1 (1945–1950) 
After the last of the liberated concentration camp prisoners had left the site in the summer of 1945, the camp was used as a special camp by the Soviet military administration from August 1945 until 1950. Nazi functionaries were held in the camp, as were political prisoners and inmates sentenced by Soviet Military Tribunals.

In the beginning, 150 prisoners from NKVD special camp Nr. 7 Weesow near Werneuchen arrived in Sachsenhausen. Apart from the crematorium and the extermination facility, almost all buildings from the former concentration camp were used again (especially the wooden barracks, the camp prison and the utility buildings). Towards the end of 1945, the camp was again fully occupied (12,000 people). In the following year, up to 16,000 people were imprisoned in the camp at times. About 2,000 female prisoners lived in a separate area of the camp.

By 1948, Sachsenhausen, now renamed "Special Camp No. 1", was the largest of three special camps in the Soviet Occupation Zone. The 60,000 people interned over five years included 6,000 German officers transferred from Western Allied camps. Others were Nazi functionaries, anti-Communists and Russians, including Nazi collaborators. By the time the camp was closed in the spring of 1950, at least 12,000 had died of malnutrition and disease.

In spring 1950, a few months after the founding of the GDR, the last Soviet camps were dissolved. About 8,000 prisoners were released from Special Camp No. 1, and a smaller group was transported to the Soviet Union. The NKVD transferred 5,500 prisoners to the GDR authorities. Among them were 1,119 women and about 30 children born in the camp (so-called "Landeskinder") were transferred to the GDR women's prison at Hoheneck/Stollberg. The injustice of the continued use of the National Socialist concentration camps by the Soviet occupying power and the renewed agonising deaths of thousands of people associated with it were concealed or played down by the SED regime. During the Waldheim trials, some survivors of the Soviet camp in Sachsenhausen were sentenced to imprisonment in Bautzen or Waldheim.

Camp staff

Commanders
 Michael Lippert, July 1936 – October 1936
 Karl-Otto Koch, October 1936 – July 1937
 Hans Helwig, July 1937 – January 1938
 Hermann Baranowski, February 1938 – September 1939
 Walter Eisfeld, 1939–1940
 Hans Loritz, 1940–1942
 Albert Sauer, 1942–1943
 Anton Kaindl, 1943–1945

Guards
Many women were among the inmates of Sachsenhausen and its subcamps. According to SS files, more than 2,000 women lived in Sachsenhausen, guarded by female SS staff (Aufseherin). Camp records show that there was one male SS soldier for every ten inmates and for every ten male SS there was a woman SS. Several subcamps for women were established in Berlin, including in Neukölln.

Sachsenhausen female guards included Ilse Koch, and later Hilde Schlusser. Anna Klein is also known to have worked at the camp.

War crimes trials
Fourteen of the concentration camp's officials, including former commandant Anton Kaindl and the camp doctor Heinz Baumkötter, as well as two Kapos, were brought to trial on 23 October 1947 before a Soviet Military Tribunal in Berlin. On 1 November 1947, all sixteen of them were found guilty. Fourteen defendants were given life sentences with hard labor, including Kaindl and Baumkötter, and two others were sentenced to fifteen years in prison with hard labor. They served their time under harsh conditions in Siberian labor camps. Six of them, including Kaindl, died in custody within a few months. In 1956, those who were still alive were released and sent back to Germany.

The Dutch sought the extradition from Czechoslovakia of Antonín Zápotocký, who became President of Czechoslovakia, for his alleged role in the murder of Dutch prisoners during his time as a kapo at the camp.

In the GDR, various subsequent trials took place against members of the SS guards of Sachsenhausen concentration camp, such as Roland Puhr and Arnold Zöllner. Puhr was executed in 1964, while Zöllner was sentenced to life imprisonment by the Rostock District Court in 1966.

In the Federal Republic of Germany, there were also various follow-up trials against guards members, such as the Sachsenhausen trials in Cologne in the 1960s. In 1960, a trial against SS-Hauptscharführer and Blockführer Richard Bugdalle for the murder of concentration camp inmates took place before the Munich II Regional Court. In March 2009 Josias Kumpf, 83 was deported from Wisconsin back to Austria after having been found to have been a SS Guard at KZ Sachsenhausen and Trawniki. In May 2022, a trial began in Germany against a SS guard at KZ Sachsenhausen of SS-Rottenführer Josef Schuetz age 101.

East Germany

East German barracks
After the Soviets vacated the site, it was used for some years by East Germany's "Kasernierte Volkspolizei", notionally a police division and in reality a precursor of the country's own National People's Army, which was formally established in 1956.

Sachsenhausen National Memorial Site ("Nationale Mahn- u. Gedenkstätte Sachsenhausen") 
In 1956, planning began for the adaptation of the concentration camp site as a national memorial. This was inaugurated four years later on 23 April 1961 by Walter Ulbricht, First Secretary of the Socialist Unity Party (SED). The first director of the renamed "Sachsenhausen National Memorial Site" ("Nationale Mahn- u. Gedenkstätte Sachsenhausen") was Christian Mahler, at one time a senior police officer, who back in the Nazi period had been an inmate at Sachsenhausen between 1938 and 1943. The plans involved the removal of most of the original buildings and the construction of an obelisk, statue and meeting area, reflecting the outlook of the government of East Germany of that time.

Other than the memorial sites in Buchenwald and Ravensbrück, the Sachsenhausen memorial, where the official celebrations of the German Democratic Republic (GDR) were held, was located in the former concentration camp. It was controlled by the Ministry of Culture, and as the National Memorial Sites Buchenwald and Ravensbrück, Sachsenhausen served as place of identification and legitimisation of the GDR.

The government of East Germany emphasised the suffering of political prisoners over that of the other groups detained at Sachsenhausen. The memorial obelisk contains eighteen red triangles, the symbol the Nazis gave to political prisoners, usually communists. There is a plaque in Sachsenhausen built in memory of the Death March. This plaque has a picture of malnourished male prisoners marching, all of whom are wearing the red triangle of a political prisoner.

Based on reporting in the newspaper Neues Deutschland, historian Anne-Kathleen Tillack-Graf shows how the Sachsenhausen National Memorial Site was politically instrumentalised in the GDR, especially during the celebrations for the liberation of the concentration camp.

Unified Germany

Museum
After German reunification, the former camp was entrusted to a foundation that opened a museum on the site. So since 1993, the "Gedenkstätte und Museum Sachsenhausen" (Sachsenhausen Memorial and Museum) has been responsible for exhibitions and research on the camp's history on the grounds of the former Sachsenhausen Concentration Camp. The educational work of the institution focuses on the history of the Oranienburg concentration camp, various aspects of the history of the Sachsenhausen concentration camp, the Soviet special camp and the history of the memorial itself.

The administrative buildings from which the entire German concentration camp network was run have been preserved and can also be seen.

, the site of the Sachsenhausen camp, at 22, Strasse der Nationen in Oranienburg, is open to the public as a museum and a memorial. Several buildings and structures survive or have been reconstructed, including guard towers, the camp entrance, crematory ovens and the camp barracks.

Excavations
With the fall of communist East Germany, it was possible to conduct excavations in the former camps. At Sachsenhausen, the bodies of 12,500 victims were found; most were children, adolescents and elderly people.

Soviet-era crimes
Following the discovery in 1990 of mass graves from the Soviet period, a separate museum was opened documenting the camp's Soviet-era history. Between 1945 and 1950, 12,000 people died of hunger and disease in the so-called Speziallager.

Neo-Nazi vandalism

The compound has been vandalized by neo-Nazis several times. In September 1992, barracks 38 and 39 of the Jewish Museum were severely damaged in an arson attack. The perpetrators were arrested, and the barracks were reconstructed by 1997. However, it is important to note that the decision was taken that no buildings built during the Nazi regime will be rebuilt on the site. The destroyed section of the huts are now a Jewish museum with the surviving section left as it was immediately after the fire with the paint still blistered from the flames.

Video game scandal
Sites within Sachsenhausen and Dachau which had been approved for inclusion in the augmented reality smartphone game Ingress were removed in July 2015; Gabriele Hammerman, director of the memorial site at Dachau, told the Deutsche Presse-Agentur that Google's actions were a humiliation for victims and relatives of the Nazi camps, and Niantic Labs' founder John Hanke stated that "we apologize that this has happened."

See also

 List of subcamps of Sachsenhausen
 List of Nazi concentration camps
 International concentration camp committees
 Franciszek Gajowniczek

Footnotes

References
 Köpp, Ulrike (1996). Die Einweihung der Nationalen Mahn- und Gedenkstätte Sachsenhausen im April 1961. „Das Hochlassen der Tauben ist zu streichen.“ – Die Vorbereitung von oben. In: Morsch, Günther (ed.), Von der Erinnerung zum Monument. Die Entstehungsgeschichte der Nationalen Mahn- und Gedenkstätte Sachsenhausen. Metropol Verlag: Berlin. pp. 289–314.
 Alexander Latotzky (Hrsg.): Kindheit hinter Stacheldraht, Mütter mit Kindern in sowjetischen Speziallagern. Forum Verlag Leipzig, Leipzig 2001, 
  Photo
 Tillack-Graf, Anne-Kathleen (2012): Erinnerungspolitik der DDR. Dargestellt an der Berichterstattung der Tageszeitung „Neues Deutschland“ über die Nationalen Mahn- und Gedenkstätten Buchenwald, Ravensbrück und Sachsenhausen. Peter Lang, Frankfurt am Main 2012. .
  web site of the

Further reading 
 Grant W. Grams: "The Story of Josef Lainck: From German Emigrant to Alien Convict and Deported Criminal to Sachsenhausen Concentration Camp Inmate", in Ibrahim Sirkeci (ed.), Border Crossing, 2020.
 
 Andrea Riedle: Die Angehörigen des Kommandanturstabs im KZ Sachsenhausen. Sozialstruktur, Dienstwege und biografische Studien, Metropol Verlag, Berlin, 2011, 
 Anne-Kathleen Tillack-Graf: Erinnerungspolitik der DDR. Dargestellt an der Berichterstattung der Tageszeitung „Neues Deutschland“ über die Nationalen Mahn- und Gedenkstätten Buchenwald, Ravensbrück und Sachsenhausen. Peter Lang, Frankfurt am Main, 2012, 
 
 KL – a History of Nazi Concentration Camps by Nikolaus Wachsmann, Little Brown, 2015 
 Claudio Cassetti, Iacopo Buonaguidi, Francesco Bertolucci, Gli italiani a Sachsenhausen. La deportazione nel lager della capitale del Terzo Reich. Rimini, Panozzo Editore, 2022,  SBN IT\ICCU\UBO\4616316
 The Extraordinary Life of Mike Cumberlege SOE by Robin Knight, FonthillMedia, 2018,

External links

 History of the Sachsenhausen-Oranienburg camp on the Jewish Virtual Library part of the American-Israeli Cooperative Enterprise
 Sachsenhausen among the Nazi camps (Germany), with list of its subcamps on a site hosted by JewishGen, Inc
 Gedenkstätte und Museum Sachsenhausen
 Soviet Special Camp officiall Website of Sachsenhausen Memorial and Museum
 Guide to the Concentration Camps Collection at the Leo Baeck Institute, New York. Contains lists of prisoners and correspondence from Sachsenhausen.
 Catalog of Pins and Medals Commemorating the Sachsenhausen Concentration Camp

 
Soviet special camps
Buildings and structures in Oberhavel
Museums in Brandenburg
World War II museums in Germany
World War II memorials in Germany
Nazi concentration camps in Germany